A marquise (marchioness) is a noblewoman with the rank of marquess, or the wife of a marquess (marquis).

Marquise may also refer to:
 Marquise, a brand of cigarettes made by Altadis
 Marquise, Pas-de-Calais, a commune of the Pas-de-Calais département in northern France
 Marquise, a diamond cut
 Marquise, a variant of the Mitsubishi MU-2 aircraft
 Marquise (film), a 1997 French film
 Chocolate marquise, a rich chocolate dessert
 Marquise, Newfoundland and Labrador, a settlement in Canada
 Marquise, a type of Bergère chair
 Marquise Goodwin, American football player, current wide receiver for the Seattle Seahawks
 Marquise Lepage, Canadian producer, screenwriter, and film and television director

See also

Marquee (disambiguation)
Marquis (disambiguation), masculine of marquise
Marchioness (disambiguation)
 Margravine, equivalent of marquise